Robert Glynn Luman (April 15, 1937 – December 27, 1978) was an American country and rockabilly singer-songwriter.

Early life and career
Luman was born in Blackjack, Texas, United States, though was raised in Nacogdoches, Texas.  His early interest in music was influenced by his father, an amateur fiddle, guitar and harmonica player.

Bob Luman received his first guitar when he was thirteen years of age.

Luman attended high school in Kilgore, where the family had moved after young Bob's birth and started his first band while in high school.

Luman had been a baseball star at his high school and tried out with the Major League Baseball Pittsburgh Pirates, but when he did not make it in professional baseball, he decided to concentrate on his music.

In 1956, he won a talent contest promoted by the Future Farmers of America, which earned him an appearance on the Louisiana Hayride.

For the Hayride, Luman formed a backup band called the Shadows, including James Burton on guitar, James Kirkland on bass and Butch White on drums.  In 1957, the band signed with Imperial Records, where they recorded "All Night Long" (b/w "Red Cadillac and a Black Mustache") and "Amarillo Blues."

That same year, the band appeared on the Town Hall Party in Los Angeles, and appeared in the movie Carnival Rock, where they backed up David Houston.

The following year, having been dropped by Imperial Records, Luman signed with Capitol Records, where he released "Try Me" and "I Know My Baby Cares."  Capitol Records wanted Luman to change his name, which he refused to do, so he left the record label and signed with Warner Bros. Records, recording "Class of '59" and "Loretta."

In 1960, Luman was inducted into the United States Army.  It was while still serving in the Army Warner Bros. Records released Luman's best-known crossover hit, "Let's Think About Living," a novelty song that hit No. 7 on the Billboard Hot 100 chart and No. 9 on the Billboard country music chart. It also reached the Top 10 in the UK Singles Chart.

After leaving the Army in 1962, Luman moved to Nashville.

On August 12, 1964, he married Barbara in Yuma, Colorado.

In 1965, he joined the Grand Ole Opry.

Later career
Luman toured frequently in the 1960s and 1970s, and became popular in Las Vegas, with an act that combined country and rockabilly.  He signed with Epic Records in 1968, and had several hits with them, including "Lonely Women Make Good Lovers" and "Still Loving You."  "Lonely Women Make Good Lovers" became his biggest country hit, hitting No. 4 on the country chart. (Steve Wariner, who had earlier been a member of Luman's band, later covered the song in 1984, and he, too, took it to No. 4 on the country charts.)

Luman's other country hits included "Ain't Got Time To Be Unhappy," (1968) "Ballad of Two Brothers" (with Autry Inman, 1968), "When You Say Love" (1972), "Neither One Of Us (Wants To Be The First To Say Goodbye)" (1973), "Proud Of You Baby" (1975), and "The Pay Phone" (1977).  Perhaps his most unusual song was a slow, soulful recitation of Johnny Cash's "I Still Miss Someone."

Luman died of pneumonia in Nashville in late December 1978.  He was 41 years old.  After his death, Bear Family Records released several compilations of his songs, including More of the Rocker, Still Rockin''' and Carnival Rock.

Legacy
Luman is a member of both the Rockabilly Hall of Fame and the Texas Country Music Hall of Fame.

His song “Lonely Women Make Good Lovers” was featured in the 1988 drama film Rain Man.

Discography
Albums

Singles

References

Further reading
Davis, W.P. (1998). "Bob Luman" In Encyclopedia of Country Music.'' P. Kingsbury, Ed. New York: Oxford University Press. pp. 308–309.
"Robert Glynn (Bob) Luman," In "Handbook of Texas Online." Texas State Historical Association.

External links
Bob Luman's page at the Rockabilly Hall of Fame

1937 births
1978 deaths
Deaths from pneumonia in Tennessee
People from Tyler, Texas
People from Kilgore, Texas
American country singer-songwriters
American male singer-songwriters
Grand Ole Opry members
Epic Records artists
Hickory Records artists
Imperial Records artists
Polydor Records artists
Sony Music Publishing artists
Warner Records artists
20th-century American singers
Singer-songwriters from Texas
Country musicians from Texas
20th-century American male singers